Associação Atlética Anapolina, or Anapolina as they are usually called, is a Brazilian football team from Anápolis in Goiás, founded on January 1, 1948.

Anapolina greatest rival is Anápolis.

Home stadium is the Jonas Duarte stadium, capacity 19,000. They play in red shirts, shorts and socks.

History

The team was founded after a club called Anápolis Sport had gone bankrupt. On April 18, 1948, Anapolina played its first match, against Ferroviário of Araguari. Anapolina won by 3–2. On March 11, 1949, Anapolina played its first interstate match, against Bangu of Rio de Janeiro city, in Anápolis. The match was won by Bangu, and the score was 4–2.

External links
Anapolina at Arquivo de Clubes
Official Site

 
Association football clubs established in 1948
Anapolina
1948 establishments in Brazil